The Girls' Singles tournament of the 2014 Asian Junior Badminton Championships was held from February 19–23 in Taipei, Taiwan. The defending champions of the last edition was Aya Ohori from Japan. Ohori competed in this event as the first seeds, but she was beaten by the eventual silver medalist Chen Yufei from China in the third round. Akane Yamaguchi of Japan claim the title after beat Chen in the final with the score 21–10, 21–15. The second and fifth seeded Busanan Ongbumrungpan of Thailand and Liang Xiaoyu of Singapore finished in the semi-finals round, settle for the bronze medal.

Seeded

  Aya Ohori (third round)
  Busanan Ongbumrungpan (semi-final)
  He Bingjiao (quarter-final)
  Akane Yamaguchi (champion)
  Liang Xiaoyu (semi-final)
  Ruthvika Shivani (third round)
  Qin Jinjing (quarter-final)
  Pornpawee Chochuwong (third round)

Draw

Finals

Top Half

Section 1

Section 2

Section 3

Section 4

Bottom Half

Section 5

Section 6

Section 7

Section 8

References

External links 
Main Draw

2014 Asian Junior Badminton Championships
Junior